Endotricha similata is a species of snout moth in the genus Endotricha. It is found in Burma, Taiwan, India and Sri Lanka and China (Hubei, Sichuan).

References

Moths described in 1888
Endotrichini